The table of years in New Zealand is a tabular display of all years in New Zealand, for overview and quick navigation to any year.

While a chronological century would include the years (e.g.) 1801 to 1900, and hence a decade would be 1801-1810 etc., for encyclopedic purposes the 100 years and 10 year spans of 1800-1899 and 1800-1809 etc. have been used respectively.



Up to 1800 
Prior to 1800 in New Zealand

1800s in New Zealand

1900s in New Zealand

2000s in New Zealand

See also
Timeline of New Zealand history
History of New Zealand
Military history of New Zealand
Timeline of the New Zealand environment
Timeline of New Zealand's links with Antarctica

 
New Zealand history-related lists
New Zealand